Come in Spinner is the soundtrack album to the Australian Broadcasting Corporation 1989/1990 television mini-series of the 1951 novel Come In Spinner by Dymphna Cusack and Florence James. The album is credited to Vince Jones and Grace Knight and peaked at number 4 on the ARIA Charts.

At the ARIA Music Awards of 1991, the album won the ARIA Award for Best Adult Contemporary Album and was nominated for Best Original Soundtrack, Cast or Show Album and Knight was nominated for Best Female Artist.

Track listing

Charts

Weekly charts

Year-end charts

Certifications

References

Vince Jones albums
1990 soundtrack albums
ARIA Award-winning albums
Soundtracks by Australian artists